Omar Ruben Larrosa (born 18 November 1947 in Lanús, Buenos Aires) is a retired Argentine footballer, who played as a midfielder, and the current assistant coach at Boca Juniors. He is perhaps most famous for having been part of the Argentine 1978 World Cup winning team.

Club career
Larrosa started his career at Boca Juniors in 1967, but he was soon allowed to leave by the club. He played for Argentinos Juniors for the 1969 season and although the team struggled, Larrosa played well and was invited to return to Boca. In the 1970 season Larrosa won his first trophy although he didn't actually play in the final of the Nacional against Rosario Central.

The following season he traveled to Central America to join Guatemalan champions CSD Comunicaciones, and was a symbol on this club that is the best in the area.

He played for Huracán between 1972 and 1976, this was a relatively successful era for the club, as well as winning the Metropolitano in 1973, the club finished as runners up in Metropolitano's 1975 and 1976 and reached the semi-finals of the Nacional in 1976.

In 1977 Larrosa was signed by Independiente for whom he played for between 1977 and 1980. These were his golden years as a player, he helped his team to win back to back Nacionals.

After Larrosa left Independiente in 1980 he had a short spell with Vélez Sársfield before joining San Lorenzo. The 1981 season progressed disastrously for San Lorenzo, ending with the club relegated from the Primera for the first time in their history, this catastrophe prompted Larrosa's retirement from football at the age of 34.

International career
Larossa was included in the Argentina squad that won the 1978 FIFA World Cup on home soil.

In the World Cup final he came on as a 65th-minute substitute with Argentina 1–0 up against the Netherlands, but Argentina couldn't hold onto their lead and the Dutch equalised in the 82nd minute. The game went into extra time and Argentina scored twice to win the game 3–1.

Player statistics
Argentina national team (1977–1978): 11 matches, 0 goals
Argentine Primera (1967–1981): 509 matches, 85 goals

Honours

Club
Boca Juniors
Nacional: 1970

Huracán
Metropolitano: 1973

Independiente
Nacional: 1977, 1978

International
Argentina
FIFA World Cup: 1978

References

External links

 
 

1947 births
Living people
Argentine footballers
FIFA World Cup-winning players
1978 FIFA World Cup players
Boca Juniors footballers
Argentinos Juniors footballers
Club Atlético Huracán footballers
Club Atlético Independiente footballers
Club Atlético Vélez Sarsfield footballers
San Lorenzo de Almagro footballers
Comunicaciones F.C. players
Footballers from Buenos Aires
Argentina international footballers
Expatriate football managers in Malaysia
Expatriate footballers in Guatemala
Argentine Primera División players
Argentine expatriate footballers
Club Atlético Huracán managers
Association football midfielders
Argentine football managers